Amma Marathanalil is an upcoming Indian Malayalam-language film, produced by Jibin George James and Justin Chacko Koyikkara, helmed by debutant Jibin George James himself, with Anoop Krishnan playing the lead role. As per the director, the film is an attempt to draw attention, "to a nostalgic journey into that simple, beautiful, green world of a Malayali, which has being lost with each and every passing moment".

Plot 
Amma Marathanalil says the importance of environment and nature for the peaceful life of human beings and tries to bring back the true-blue Malayali roots.

Cast 
Anoop Krishnan 
Sreekanth Sreekumar
Justin Chacko Koyikkara
Ameer Ali
Jithu Menon Karattu
Sunil Vikram
Karthik Poonthanam
Fayees Nowshad
Devasurya
Shalini Dinesh
Sini Prasad  
Jaseena Jaseem
Fathima Nowshad

Production
Actor Anoop Krishnan, who plays Prakashan put on weight to play a matured communist party follower, who has a deep sense of attachment to the sacred grove and the crowded trees in his Tharavad, where he always feels his mother's presence. A crowdfunded project, the film was completed in 22 days for a mere budget of 3,00,000 rupees at the locations of Pattambi.

References

External links
 

Upcoming directorial debut films
Upcoming films
Environmental films
Films shot in Palakkad